Dermot Anthony O'Reilly (1942 – 17 February 2007) was an Irish-born Canadian musician, producer and songwriter.

Life
He was born in Dublin, Ireland, and educated at Inchicore, County Dublin.

In March 1968, O'Reilly emigrated to Toronto where he met future bandmates Fergus O'Byrne and Denis Ryan. He was one of the founding members of The Sons of Erin and helped form the band Sullivan's Gypsies in 1970.

In 1971, O'Reilly, O'Byrne and Ryan moved to St. John's and began performing as Ryan's Fancy. Ryan's Fancy became a popular Irish group that released 12 albums and hosted a successful television program for several seasons. O'Reilly wrote and produced many Irish songs as a member of Ryan's Fancy, as a solo artist and later as a member of the group Brishney. O'Reilly performed regularly with Fergus O'Byrne.

In 2004, Ryan's Fancy was honored with a Lifetime Achievement Award by the East Coast Music Association. After Ryan's Fancy disbanded, O'Reilly founded Piperstock Productions, a video production and marketing company based in Torbay, Newfoundland and Labrador.

O'Reilly died of a heart attack, aged 64, in St. John's and is survived by his wife, Ann, and their three daughters.

Works
Some of Piperstock's video productions are:
 The Last Run
 Rigs, Jigs and Songs from the Heart
 Cain's Legacy

See also
 Music of Newfoundland and Labrador
 List of Newfoundland songs

References

External links
Bio at Ryans Fancy website
Dermot O'Reilly - Encyclopedia of Newfoundland and Labrador, v. 4, p. 178

1942 births
2007 deaths
Canadian folk musicians
Irish emigrants to Canada
Memorial University of Newfoundland alumni
Musicians from County Dublin
Musicians from St. John's, Newfoundland and Labrador
Musicians from Toronto
20th-century Canadian male musicians